Duke Yì of Qi (died 609 BC) was from 612 to 609 BC ruler of the State of Qi, a major power during the Spring and Autumn period of ancient China.  His personal name was Lü Shangren (呂商人), ancestral name Jiang (姜), and Duke Yì was his posthumous title.

Accession to the throne
Duke Yì's father was Duke Huan of Qi, who was the first of the Five Hegemons, the most powerful rulers of the Spring and Autumn period.  Duke Huan had at least three main wives who bore no sons, six favoured concubines, and more than ten sons.  Duke Yì was then known as Prince Shangren, and his mother was Mi Ji, a princess of the minor state of Mi (密).  Five other sons of Duke Huan also contended for the throne: Prince Wukui, Crown Prince Zhao (later Duke Xiao), Prince Pan (later Duke Zhao), Prince Yuan (later Duke Hui), and Prince Yong.

When Duke Huan died in the tenth month of 643 BC, the six princes  fought one another for the throne. Wukui prevailed at first, but was killed three months later and replaced by Duke Xiao.  Duke Xiao died after ten years of reign, and was succeeded by Duke Zhao whose supporters killed Duke Xiao's son.

Duke Zhao reigned for 20 years and died in the fifth month of 613 BC, and his son She ascended the throne.  However, just two months later Prince Shangren murdered his nephew on the tomb of Duke Xiao and usurped the throne.  He was the fourth of five sons of Duke Huan to become the ruler of the state, and was posthumously known as Duke Yì of Qi.

Death and succession
Duke Yì reigned for four years, and was killed by Bing Chu (邴歜) and Yan Zhi (閻職) in 609 BC.  The ministers of Qi deposed his son and installed his half-brother Prince Yuan, who was then exiled in the State of Wey, on the throne.  Prince Yuan would become known as Duke Hui of Qi.

Ancestry

References

Year of birth unknown
Monarchs of Qi (state)
7th-century BC Chinese monarchs
609 BC deaths
7th-century BC murdered monarchs
Assassinated Chinese politicians